Dag Roar Ørsal (born 20 July 1980) is a Norwegian football midfielder who currently plays for IL Hødd.

His former clubs are Ørsta IL, FK Haugesund, Molde FK and Aalesunds FK.

References
FK Haugesund squad list

1980 births
Living people
Norwegian footballers
Eliteserien players
IL Hødd players
Molde FK players
Aalesunds FK players
FK Haugesund players
Sportspeople from Møre og Romsdal

Association football midfielders